David Boutin may refer to:

David Boutin (actor) (born 1969), Canadian actor
David Boutin (politician), American state legislator